The 2015–16 season is Scunthorpe United's 117th season in their existence and their second consecutive season in League One. Along with competing in League One, the club will also participate in the FA Cup, League Cup and JP Trophy. The season covers the period from 1 July 2015 to 30 June 2016.

Squad

Statistics

|-
|colspan=14|Players who have left the club during the season:

|}

Goals record

Disciplinary record

Transfers

Transfers in

Transfers out

Loans in

Loans out

Competitions

Pre-season friendlies
On 19 May 2015, Scunthorpe United announced two pre-season friendlies against Bolton Wanderers and Gainsborough Trinity. A third pre-season friendly was confirmed on 11 June 2015, against Hartlepool United. On 18 June 2015, the Iron announced Sheffield Wednesday will visit one-week prior to the league opener. On 24 June 2015, a friendly fixture away to Notts County was confirmed. On 18 July 2015, it was announced Iron will face Middlesbrough in Marbella.

League One

League table

Matches

FA Cup

League Cup

Football League Trophy
On 8 August 2015, live on Soccer AM the draw for the first round of the Football League Trophy was drawn by Toni Duggan and Alex Scott.

Lincolnshire Senior Cup
On 3 June 2015, Scunthorpe United announced the details for the 2015 Lincolnshire Senior Cup. On 25 July 2015, the details of the semi-final were confirmed.

References

Scunthorpe United
Scunthorpe United F.C. seasons